Marie Pinkney is a social worker and member of the Delaware Senate from New Castle County, Delaware. A newcomer to politics, in September 2020 she defeated incumbent State Senate President Pro Tempore David McBride in the Democratic primary election by a 52.4%-47.6% margin. In the heavily-Democratic majority minority 13th District, the Democratic nomination is considered tantamount to election.

Pinkney defeated Republican nominee Alexander Homich in the general election of November 3, 2020. Pinkney is the first openly queer woman elected to serve in Delaware's state legislature, after Senator Karen E. Peterson came out as gay in 2013 while in office. She is one of three LGBTQ+ candidates to be elected to the Delaware General Assembly in 2020, along with Sarah McBride and Eric Morrison.

Personal life 
Pinkney grew up in New Castle and Wilmington. She attended Howard High School of Technology and Delaware State University. She worked at a treatment center for adolescents with mental health and substance abuse problems, and now works as a trauma social worker and case manager at Christiana Hospital. Pinkney identifies as queer and is an active member of Christiana Care PRIDE, the LGBTQ+ employee resource group at her workplace.

References

External links 
Pinkney campaign website

American social workers
African-American state legislators in Delaware
Women state legislators in Delaware
Year of birth missing (living people)
Living people
Democratic Party members of the Delaware House of Representatives
LGBT state legislators in Delaware
LGBT African Americans
Queer women
21st-century African-American people
21st-century African-American women